Gulmarwadi is a village in the Karmala taluka of Solapur district in Maharashtra state, India.

Demographics
Covering  and comprising 103 households at the time of the 2011 census of India, Gulmarwadi had a population of 533. There were 271 males and 262 females, with 95 people being aged six or younger.

References

Villages in Karmala taluka